Shul (also Romanized as Shūl) is a village in Arudan Rural District, in the Central District of Mohr County, Fars Province, Iran. At the 2006 census, its population was 462, in 89 families.

References 

Populated places in Mohr County